Franco Nicolás Balbi (born August 21, 1989), is an Argentinian professional basketball player who currently plays with Boca Juniors in the Liga Nacional de Básquet. At a height of 6'2" (1.88 m) tall, he plays at the point guard position.

Professional career
Balbi started playing youth club basketball with Club Villa Belgrano, in the city of Junín, when he was 5. He also played with Los Indios de Junín at the youth level, before arriving at Ciclista Juninense, where he made his debut in Argentina's top-level league, the Liga Nacional de Básquet (LNB), on January 14, 2007, against Regatas Corrientes. The following season, Ciclista Juninense got relegated, and had to play in Argentina's second division, the Torneo Nacional de Ascenso (TNA). Balbi turned into a key player on the team, including playing more minutes and having good games, which made Quimsa from Santiago del Estero, sign him up for the 2009–10 LNB season, marking his return to the Argentine first division. That same season, he suffered a severe injury that made him lose minutes the following season, and that ultimately led Quimsa to terminate his contract. He quickly managed to find a new club, San Martín de Corrientes, which he helped achieve a league promotion to the Argentine first division, by finishing as runner-ups in the Torneo Nacional de Ascenso (TNA).

In the following season, he returned to Ciclista Juninense, to play in the second division. After two good seasons, he signed with the club's local rivals, Argentino de Junín, for the 2013–14 LNB season, were he would return to play under his first professional head coach, Adrián Capelli.

With Argentino de Junín, he played in both the 2013–14 season of the Liga Nacional de Básquet, and the Liga Sudamericana de Básquetbol (FIBA South American League). It was a great season, for both him and the club, with the team making the semifinals of both tournaments. In the 2014–15 LNB season, he became a regular starter for Argentino de Junín, and once again played in the Liga Nacional de Básquet and the Liga Sudamericana de Básquetbol. He became an established player in the top level Argentinian league, and received noticeable coverage from the local press.

Ferro
On May 23, 2016, Balbi signed with Ferro, for the Argentine 2016–17 Liga Nacional de Básquet season.

Flamengo
On June 21, 2018, Balbi signed with the Brazilian NBB club Flamengo, for the 2018–19 NBB season, which marked his first club playing experience outside of Argentina.

2018–2019
In his first year with Flamengo Balbi had a successful season winning the Rio de Janeiro State Championship, Brazilian Super 8 Cup and the NBB league. Besides that he was elected the league's Best Foreign Player and selected to the All-NBB Team, averaging 10.8 ppg and 5.7 apg in 26 regular season games.

2019–2020
On June 19, 2019, Balbi re-signed with Flamengo for one more year.

National team career
After a good 2014–15 LNB season with Argentino de Junín, he was selected to the senior Argentine national basketball team for the first time. He made his debut against Uruguay, in Olavarría.

Career statistics

LNB career statistics

NBB regular season

NBB playoffs

References

External links
FIBA Profile
Latinbasket.com Profile
Novo Basquete Brasil Profile 

1989 births
Living people
Argentine expatriate basketball people in Brazil
Argentine men's basketball players
Argentino de Junín basketball players
Ciclista Juninense basketball players
Club San Martín de Corrientes basketball players
Ferro Carril Oeste basketball players
Flamengo basketball players
Boca Juniors basketball players
Novo Basquete Brasil players
People from Junín, Buenos Aires
Point guards
Quimsa basketball players
Sportspeople from Buenos Aires Province